Dapania is a genus of flowering plants belonging to the family Oxalidaceae.

Its native range is Madagascar, Western Malesia.

Species:

Dapania grandifolia 
Dapania pentandra 
Dapania racemosa

References

Oxalidaceae
Oxalidales genera